As of April 2020, CityJet operates scheduled flights to the following destinations on wet-lease agreements with Scandinavian Airlines. It ceased scheduled operations under its own brand name on 28 October 2018.

Wet-lease destinations

Destinations operated for Scandinavian Airlines

References

Lists of airline destinations